HMT Gulland was one of a number of s built for the Royal Navy during the Second World War for a variety of tasks, including anti-submarine patrol. She was launched placed on the disposal list after the war and sold to Belgian owners in March 1946. The following year the ship changed hands and was renamed Henken and two years later sold to Arab Navigation & Transport Co. in Aden and renamed Arab Trader.

On 13 April 1951 the ship grounded three miles north of Mombasa, Kenya, while on a voyage from Aden to Mauritius with a cargo of lentils. Within a day or two the heavy seas flooded the engine and boiler room, and the wreck settled on the reef with the main deck awash at high water. With a cargo that was now worthless and no one in Mombasa capable of salvaging the ship, she was abandoned as a total loss. The wreck broke up in the surf and at a later date the remains were demolished with explosives. What was left of the wreck was rediscovered in the 1970s on an extremely low tide in front of the Reef Hotel consisting of a pile of steel plate and machinery on the edge of the reef at its current location.

Isles-class trawlers
Ships built on the Humber
1943 ships
World War II minesweepers of the United Kingdom
World War II patrol vessels of the United Kingdom
Merchant ships of Belgium
Maritime incidents in 1951
Shipwrecks of Africa